Up until Peter Hodge was hired after World War I, Leicester City F.C. had no official manager. A nominal role of secretary/manager was employed, though the board and the selection committee took control of most team affairs. It was Hodge who instated a system at the club for the manager having complete control over player and staff recruitment, team selection and tactics. Though Hodge was originally also titled "secretary/manager" he has retrospectively been named as the club's first official "manager".

Leicester City's current manager Brendan Rodgers is the club's 48 permanent manager. Former managers Nigel Pearson and Peter Hodge have both had two separate spells at the club, Dave Bassett also had a second spell as caretaker manager after his spell as permanent manager. Listed below is Leicester's complete managerial history.

This is the full list with dates of tenure and records while at the club.

Key
P = Games played
W = Games won
D = Games drawn
L = Games lost
Win% = Percentage of games won

Secretary/Managers

Managers
Caretakers names are in italics.

Notes
When exact date of the managerial stint is unknown, only the month and the year is given.
Tom Bromilow, Tom Mather and Johnny Duncan all took charge of wartime fixtures, which are not counted as "competitive fixtures."
Matt Gillies stint includes a period between January 1968 and March 1968 when Gillies was ill with tuberculosis and Bert Johnson took control of first team affairs.
During the 1986–87 season both Gordon Milne and Bryan Hamilton shared managerial duties with Milne assuming the title "General Manager" and Hamilton assuming the title "Team Manager"

By nationality
This table lists the Leicester manager by nationality. Includes permanent managers and secretary/manager only.

References

 
Leicester City
football